Ernst Ueckermann (born Estcourt in 1954) is a South African composer and pianist.

His formal music studies were conducted at the Johannesburg Art School, Royal College and Royal Academy of Music in London, the Musikhochschulen of Würzburg and Freiburg, Germany, with Professors Kirsti Hjort, Bertold Hummel and Helmut Barth. He has participated in numerous master classes with  members of the Melos Ensemble, Brahms Trio, Moscow piano trio and some of the world's foremost pianists.

His pianistic career gained momentum during his student years and culminated in a busy international career. Concerts and recordings have been done in many capitals all over the globe as soloist, with diverse chamber music ensembles and as accompanist. Compact disks, radio productions and Television concerts have also been produced for amongst other; the Bavarian Broadcasting Company, West German Radio and Television, Swiss Radio (Zuerich), Rádio Portugal, Azores Television, Korean Television, Adv Vienna and Television Cultura in Brazil.

Ernst Ueckermann's compositions include works for orchestra, chamber music, solo pieces and four song cycles, of which several have been commissioned. He received composition prizes in 1980 and 1982. Numerous compositions have been recorded by diverse broadcasting companies and have been performed at international festivals. His work - which includes three manuals on "Creative Harmony" - is published by the Braun-Peretti Verlag in Bonn.

He currently lectures composition techniques at the University of Cologne and heads a piano and chamber music class at the Musikhochschule Wuerzburg.

Publications

External links
 Website: Ernst Ueckermann
 DREAMS / Contrabaixo Ibero-Americano
 Ernst Ueckermann at the Hochschule für Musik Würzburg website

1954 births
Living people
South African composers
South African male composers
South African musicians
South African pianists
South African classical pianists
Musicians
Alumni of the Royal College of Music
Alumni of the Royal Academy of Music
Hochschule für Musik Freiburg alumni
21st-century classical pianists
21st-century male musicians